Bourem-Inaly  is a village and commune of the Cercle of Timbuktu in the Tombouctou Region of Mali. In 1998 the commune had a population of 8,532.

References

Communes of Tombouctou Region